Dryptus marmoratus is a species of air-breathing land snail, a terrestrial pulmonate gastropod mollusc in the family Amphibulimidae.

Distribution 
 This species occurs in El Hatillo Municipality, Miranda, Venezuela

References

External links 

Amphibulimidae
Gastropods described in 1844